Daoxue, sometimes translated as Taology, may refer to:

Taoist philosophy
Neo-Confucianism

See also
Taoism
Confucianism